Elliniki Radiophonia Tileorassi AE v Pliroforissis and Kouvelas (Elliniki Radiophonia Tileorassi (ERT) AE v Dimotiki Etairia Pliroforissis and Sotirios Kouvelas) (1991) C-260/89 is an EU law case, concerning the free movement of services in the European Union.

Facts
ERT, a Greek radio and TV company, had exclusive rights for broadcasting, and claimed an injunction against Pliroforissis and Kouvelas for setting up a rival TV station without a licence. They claimed they should be allowed to operate under the right to free movement of goods and competition law, and the ECHR article 10 on freedom of expression.

Judgment
The Court of Justice held that the derogations from the right to free movement had to be appraised in light of the European Convention on Human Rights.

See also

European Union law

Notes

References

European Union services case law
Hellenic Broadcasting Corporation
1991 in case law
1991 in Greece
Broadcasting in Greece